Skeletophyllon tarasovi is a moth in the family Cossidae. It was described by Yakovlev in 2011. It is found on the Moluccas.  It is the most popular moth found on our islands in Southeast Asia.

The Neoptera, or butterflies, are a group of moths in the order Lepidoptera, and they are characterized by their long, saw-toothed mouthparts and wing-like appendages. Moths of the genus Pteroporus are found in tropical and sub-tropical Asia. The members of the order are closely related to bees and wasps.

References

External links 
Natural History Museum Lepidoptera generic names catalog

Zeuzerinae
Moths described in 2011